Charles Henry Juliá Barreras (May 7, 1908 – July 28, 1979) was a three-time member of the Senate of Puerto Rico. He won a seat in the Senate of Puerto Rico for the Partido Estadista Republicano in the 1952, 1956 and 1960 elections. He was a delegate to Republican National Convention from Puerto Rico in 1956 and 1960. In the seventies he was also a judge in San Juan.

On September 1, 1938 he was elected as a delegate for the district of San Juan to the board of the Puerto Rico Bar Association.

While a student at University of Puerto Rico, Rio Piedras Campus he and a group of other students founded what was to become Phi Sigma Alpha fraternity on October 22, 1928. He was later the fourth president of Phi Sigma Alpha fraternity.

Charles Henry Juliá Barreras died on July 28, 1979. He was interred at the Puerto Rico National Cemetery in Bayamón, Puerto Rico.

References

1908 births
1979 deaths
Members of the Senate of Puerto Rico
Phi Sigma Alpha founders
People from Santurce, Puerto Rico
Puerto Rican military officers
United States Army officers
University of Puerto Rico alumni
20th-century American politicians